The Society for Old Testament Study (SOTS) is a learned society, based in the British Isles, of professional scholars and others committed to the study of the Hebrew Bible / Old Testament.

History 
SOTS was inaugurated at King's College, London on 3 January 1917, in response to a felt need for better public engagement with the Old Testament and greater collegiality among those studying it. There were 30 original members, but this soon grew to over 100 in the 1920s, and subsequently grew to over 200 in the 1940s, over 300 in the 1950s, and over 400 in the 1960s; membership numbers have been in excess of 500 since the early 2000s. About three-fifths of the members are resident in the British Isles, while two-fifths reside in other parts of the world, primarily in mainland Europe and in the USA.

The first President of the Society was William H. Bennett and the first Secretary was Theodore H. Robinson. On rare occasions a Meeting of the Society has been conducted much further afield: in 1952 a special meeting was held at the Pontifical Biblical Institute in Rome, and in 1966 a business meeting was held at the Presbyterian Hospice in Tiberias, on the shore of the Sea of Galilee (as part of a SOTS study tour of the Holy Land).

Over its first century of operations, the Society conducted 195 Meetings, at which 1,448 academic papers were delivered, by 687 presenters.

Activities 
The Society serves the varying needs of its members for support of their scholarly activities in the study of the Old Testament through such activities as organizing meetings (save during the years of World War 2, commissioning and promoting publications, and representing scholars of the Old Testament on other academic bodies.

Two regular meetings are normally held each year. The summer meeting is normally held in the third week of July and at the university at which the President of that year teaches. The winter meeting in the first week of January is at different academic institutions in the United Kingdom or the Republic of Ireland. A joint meeting with the equivalent Dutch Society, the Oudtestamentisch Werkgezelschap (OTW), is held every three years, alternating between a venue in the British Isles and a venue in the Netherlands.

Membership of SOTS is open to suitably qualified persons, who are normally expected to have knowledge of Biblical Hebrew, and whose applications for membership must be supported by two current members.

A new President is elected each year.

Publications 
At regular intervals SOTS publishes volumes of essays which aim to provide an overview of the state of the study of the Old Testament at the time of publication. Examples include The People and the Book (ed. A.S. Peake; Oxford, 1925), Record and Revelation (ed. H.W. Robinson; Oxford, 1938), The Old Testament and Modern Study (ed. H.H. Rowley; Oxford, 1951), Tradition and Interpretation (ed. G.W. Anderson; Oxford, 1979), and Text in Context (ed. A.D.H. Mayes; Oxford, 2000).

The Society has also sometimes commissioned other multi-essay volumes devoted to specific topics, such as Documents from Old Testament Times (ed. D.W. Thomas; London, 1958), Archaeology and Old Testament Study (ed. D.W. Thomas; Oxford, 1967), Peoples of Old Testament Times (ed. D.J. Wiseman; Oxford, 1973), The World of Ancient Israel: Sociological, Anthropological and Political Perspectives (ed. R.E. Clements; Cambridge, 1989), and SOTS at 100: Centennial Essays of the Society for Old Testament Study (ed. J. Jarick; London, 2017).

The Society sponsors the SOTS Monograph Series, published by Cambridge University Press, and a series of Study Guides to the Old Testament, published by Bloomsbury T&T Clark. Since 1946 it publishes an annual SOTS Book List (appearing also as an issue of the Journal for the Study of the Old Testament), offering short reviews of hundreds of publications in the field of Old Testament studies each year, and it operates a “SOTS Wiki”, providing a reliable source of information about the Old Testament on the Web.

Presidents

References

Sources

Further reading

External links 
 Official SOTS website
 SOTS Wiki website

Biblical studies organizations

Learned societies of the United Kingdom